Meet the Barkers is a reality television series which aired on MTV. The series followed the everyday life of married couple, Blink-182 drummer Travis Barker and Shanna Moakler, as well as Moakler and Barker's two children, Alabama Luella Barker and Landon Asher Barker. Moakler and Oscar De La Hoya's daughter, Atiana Cecelia De La Hoya, also appeared on the show. Meet the Barkers lasted two seasons, airing 16 episodes.

In 2008, MuchMusic (before becoming Much) started airing Meet the Barkers after Barker's involvement with the 2008 South Carolina Learjet 60 crash.

Family members
 Travis Barker (born November 14, 1975) is the drummer of Blink 182 and The Transplants, and (formerly of) The Aquabats, Box Car Racer, and +44.
 Shanna Moakler (born March 28, 1975) is a former Miss New York USA, Miss USA (received crown when the winner Chelsi Smith became Miss Universe), and Playboy model. She played "Monica Harper" on the television series Pacific Blue from 1998 though 2000.
 Atiana Cecelia De La Hoya (born March 29, 1999) is the daughter of Moakler and boxer Oscar De La Hoya.
 Landon Asher Barker (born October 9, 2003) is Barker and Moakler's son and the oldest.
 Alabama Luella Barker (born December 24, 2005) is Barker and Moakler's daughter and the youngest. She was born during the production of season two and only shown in the final episode. Despite the Barkers celebrating Christmas with Alabama present, scenes involving the then-newborn were filmed in early 2006.

Episode guide

Season 1

Season 2

References

External links
 
 Official Website at MTV.com

2005 American television series debuts
2006 American television series endings
2000s American reality television series
MTV original programming